HEI Hotels & Resorts is a hospitality owner and operator based in Norwalk, Connecticut. Founded by brothers Gary and Steve Mendell, HEI owns and manages over 90 full service, upper-upscale and luxury hotels and resorts throughout the United States under brand names as Marriott, Hilton, Embassy Suites, Westin, Le Méridien and Sheraton.

HEI Hotels & Resorts is very involved in environmental stewardship, investing in new technologies to cut energy use at its properties. In 2011, President Obama selected HEI to participate in "Better Building Challenge", and the company is a repeat winner of U.S. Environmental Protection Agency's Energy Star Partner of the Year.

References

External links 
 

Companies based in Norwalk, Connecticut
Hospitality companies of the United States